The Steinberg Wellness Center, formally known as the Wellness, Recreation and Athletic Center (WRAC), is a 2,500-seat multi-purpose arena in Brooklyn, New York. It was built in 2006 and is home to the LIU Sharks Men's and Women's Basketball, Women's Volleyball, Women's Fencing, Women's Swimming & Diving and Women's Water Polo teams. LIU previously played their home games at the Schwartz Athletic Center. Following President David Steinberg's retirement in Spring 2013, the WRAC was renamed the Steinberg Wellness Center to honor his 27-year tenure as President.

See also
 List of NCAA Division I basketball arenas

References

External links
LIU Athletics Site

2006 establishments in New York City
College basketball venues in the United States
Sports venues in Brooklyn
Indoor arenas in New York City
Sports venues completed in 2006
LIU Brooklyn Blackbirds basketball
Basketball venues in New York City
College volleyball venues in the United States
Swimming venues in New York City
College swimming venues in the United States
Volleyball venues in New York City